NTUC FairPrice is the largest supermarket chain in Singapore. The company is a co-operative of the National Trades Union Congress (NTUC). The group has 100 supermarkets across the island, with over 160 outlets of Cheers convenience stores island-wide.

NTUC FairPrice has partnered with ExxonMobil to run several stations with a FairPrice branding at the minimarts at their stations. The supermarket has the slogan "Singapore's very own".

History
In November 1972, NTUC announced its news consumer co-operative Welcome which would opened in February 1973. On 22 July 1973, Prime Minister Lee Kuan Yew opened the first supermarket at Block 192, Toa Payoh Lorong 4, and it was the first of its kind.

In August 2007, FairPrice opened its upmarket outlet at Bukit Timah Plaza named FairPrice Finest, after five months of refurbishment. The move was to cater to the changing tastes of Singaporeans who are increasingly well-travelled. The , two-storey outlet has an offering of products different from other FairPrice stores, and also features a Swiss-style delicatessen, a wine cellar and a European bakery.

FairPrice has attempted to expand into other countries. In 2003, it entered a joint venture with DBS Private Equity, New Hope Group, Silver Tie and Taiwan's Apex Group, known as Nextmall. The venture provided merchandising, management and logistics for a fee to Nextmart which is a China incorporated hypermarket. Seven hypermarkets were opened in China, with its first in Shaoxing, Zhejiang. Nextmall closed in 2005 after incurring a total of $80 million in debts and over $40 million in losses. A supermarket in Vietnam was opened in 2013 under a joint venture with Saigon Union of Trading Co-operatives, known as Co.opXtra Plus. FairPrice also operated Cheers convenience stores in Vietnam as of 2018.

Retail formats

Cheers by FairPrice – This 24-hour convenience store chain run by NTUC FairPrice was introduced in 1999. It offers similar facilities to rival 7-Eleven.
FairPrice Shop
FairPrice Xpress 
FairPrice Finest – This is a separate store offering up-market food supplies. It was officially opened in September 2007, and also it merged the former Liberty Market. Stores include Bedok Mall, Waterway Point, Century Square, Junction 8, Jurong Point and Seletar Mall.
FairPrice Xtra – A hypermarket chain which combines a normal supermarket and the FairPrice Homemart in one store. It sells items such as electronics, clothing and household merchandise in addition to the regular supermarket items, and also it merged the former FairPrice Homemart, together with former Carrefour stuffs. Stores include AMK Hub, Jurong Point, UE BizHub East, Kallang Wave, Jem and Nex.
Warehouse Club - Started in 2014, the Warehouse Club is modelled on American warehouse club chain, Costco, and it is only available through membership. It offers bulk purchases with discounts.
Unity Pharmacy

Every year, FairPrice offers NTUC Union Members (NTUC cardholders) and FairPrice shareholders dividends, along with cash-back rebates for all purchases made at FairPrice supermarkets island-wide.

In collaboration with OCBC Bank, FairPrice launched its FairPrice Plus membership programme in April 2007, offering banking solutions and promotions at all FairPrice supermarkets islandwide for all supermarket customers.

Union 
Employees of NTUC FairPrice are represented by the Food, Drinks and Allied Workers' Union (FDAWU), an affiliate of the National Trades Union Congress.

References

Supermarkets of Singapore
Retail companies established in 1973
ExxonMobil
Convenience stores of Singapore
1973 establishments in Singapore
Singaporean brands